Taipei Nangang Exhibition Center is a metro station in Taipei, Taiwan served by Taipei Metro. It is a terminal station on both Wenhu line and Bannan line, and serves the Nangang, Neihu, and Xizhi districts.

Station overview

The station is a three-level, divided into an elevated and underground portion, each serving different lines. The elevated portion of the station serving the medium-capacity Wenhu line features an island platform and a platform elevator located on the west side of the concourse level. It is equipped with platform screen doors.

The station is a two-level, underground station high-capacity, and is also equipped with platform screen doors. The station (serving the Blue Line eastern extension) passes through tunnels belonging to the Taiwan Railways Administration and Taiwan High Speed Rail before terminating at this station. The station is expected to serve as a transfer station for around 200,000 commuters per month. Preliminary inspections began on 9 January 2011, and the extension opened on 27 February 2011. The opening of the station is responsible for increasing the system's ridership by over 16,000 passengers per day.

Before Blue Line portion of the station was completed, the station already served as a transfer station via a free shuttle bus to Nangang Station. The shuttle bus service came to an end with the opening of Blue Line platform.

Public art
As one of the stations chosen for public art projects on the Neihu Line, the station design and artwork reflect the development of the adjacent business park. The design theme of the station is "Light and Shadow". The roof of the platform utilizes a large-span truss space and the sides of the platform use ripples to reflect sunlight. Public art consists of three pieces: "Fleeting Light", "Flying Shadow", and "River in the Sky". "Fleeting Light" uses images of flowing water to decorate the entrance columns, "Flying Shadow" is located outside the curtain wall, and "River in the Sky" (above the Neihu Line platform) shows the flickers of flowing water.

The Nangang Line concourse features a piece called "Our Personal Public Art" featuring LCD screen displaying images of chronicling the development of human civilization. In the underground passageway, another piece titled "Fast and Slow" has anodized aluminum panels and light panels controlled by motion sensors.

History
The station was initially named Nangang Business Park South, but later changed to its current name.

Construction of the Taipei Nangang Exhibition Center station begins on 16 June 2003; and completed on 28 February 2009 for the Neihu Line, before opening on 4 July 2009.

Taipei Mayor Hau Lung-pin made a special inspection visit to the station to assess construction of the Bannan Line extension on 3 December 2010. Heat, ventilation, and air-conditioning (HVAC) systems had been completed, along with tunneling and trackwork. Stability testing of the electrical and mechanical systems were still ongoing.

The station passed preliminary inspections on 9 January 2011 before opening on 27 February 2011. The second and third phase inspections occurred in the following weeks. Although the extension opened at 2 PM, by 6 PM over 1.1 million people had used the entire system, a 229,000 passenger increase from the same period the previous week.

Station layout

Around the station
 Taipei Nangang Exhibition Center
 Lingnan Fine Arts Museum

References

Wenhu line stations
Bannan line stations
Railway stations opened in 2009